Circus is a 1989 Indian television series directed by Aziz Mirza and Kundan Shah, set in a circus troupe, starring Shahrukh Khan, Makarand Deshpande, Pavan Malhotra, Ashutosh Gowariker, Neeraj Vora, Hyder Ali and many other talented actors.

Cast
 Shahrukh Khan as Shekharan Rai
 Sunil Shendey as Sahdevan Rai a.k.a. Babuji, Shekharan' Father
 Sameer Khakhar as Chintamani
 Rekha Sahay as Valsamma
 Naeem Shah as Sultan
 Amrut Patel as Professor Bowkar
 Renuka Shahane as Maria
 Satish Kaul as Aditya
 Anita Sarin as Prabha
 Dimple Hirji as Minaz
 Naresh Suri as John Jonathan/Joe, Maria's Father
 Haidar Ali as Subroto, Ringmaster
 Somesh Agarwal as Gupta
 Pavan Malhotra as Rasik
 Ashutosh Gowariker as Vicky
 Makrand Deshpande as Kanti
 Neeraj Vora as Changu
 Sharad Bhagtani as Mangu
 Sidharth Basu as Circus Staff
 Sunil Advani as Swami

Guest cast
 Rama Vij as Shyamli
 Puja Bhatkal as Bulbul

Episodes
Animal seller, visits Apollo Circus and requests Babuji, who is the owner of the Circus, to purchase a Bear as it would be of great benefit for his Circus but Babuji refuses citing an ongoing financial crisis. Rao, the owner of Atlas Circus meets Babuji and offers to buy his Circus which infuriates Babuji as he has no intention of selling his Circus which he has been running for close to 25 years. In the evening Jonathan has a heated argument with Kanti and Vicky, fellow artists of the Circus, and Sultan has to interfere to cool things down. Kanti and Vicky are fed of Jonathan's regular habit of getting drunk and picking up fights with everyone and wonder why Babuji doesn't throw him out of the Circus, to which Sultan replies that Babuji would never do that because Jonathan has always been loyal to Apollo Circus and did not bother to join a new Circus despite being the best Trapeze artist of the country. Many years ago, Jonathan was one of the star artists of Apollo Circus but due to an accident he lost his leg and had to take an early retirement. Later in the day, Babuji receives a call from his son Shekharan who informs him that he will soon be returning to India. Out of sheer happiness Babuji decides to buy a new Bear from Singh for his Circus.

References

External links

Indian drama television series
1989 Indian television series debuts
1990 Indian television series endings
Circus television shows
DD National original programming
1980s Indian television series